The Siam InterContinental Hotel was a luxury hotel in Bangkok, Thailand. It stood on Rama I Road, in the neighbourhood now known as Siam in Pathum Wan District, on land leased from Sa Pathum Palace. It opened as part of Pan Am's InterContinental hotel chain in 1966, operated by the Bangkok Intercontinental Hotels Company. It stood until 2002 when it was demolished to make way for the Siam Paragon shopping mall. The Siam InterContinental was Bangkok's first luxury international-brand hotel, and was also particularly known for the striking design of its main building, by American architect Joseph P. Salerno.

See also
Erawan Hotel
Dusit Thani Bangkok

References

External links
 

InterContinental hotels
Defunct hotels in Bangkok
Demolished buildings and structures in Bangkok
Pathum Wan district
Hotel buildings completed in 1966
Buildings and structures demolished in 2002
Demolished hotels